Örebro University Hospital (Swedish: Universitetssjukhuset Örebro, USÖ) is a university hospital in Örebro, Sweden.

The hospital is operated by Örebro County Council and took its current name in 2000, having previously been called Örebro Regional Hospital. Örebro University, which was awarded full university status in 1999, and the County Council have long tried to establish a governmentally funded medical school in Örebro in collaboration with the hospital. On 30 March 2010, the university was granted the right to award medical degrees, making it the 7th medical school in Sweden.

Famous births
Olle Westling and Ewa Westling's youngest child and only son Daniel Westling, now Prince of Sweden, was born on 15 September 1973 at Örebro Hospital.

References

External links
  
  

Teaching hospitals in Sweden
Hospitals established in the 1770s
Örebro University